Scaliognathus is an extinct genus of conodonts.

The Tournaisian, the oldest age of the Mississippian contains eight conodont biozones, one of which is the zone of Gnathodus pseudosemiglaber and Scaliognathus anchoralis.

References

External links 
 
 

Mississippian conodonts
Ozarkodinida genera
Fossil taxa described in 1941